Alem is both a surname and a given name. Notable people with the name include:

Surname 
 Leandro Alem, Argentine politician
 Raja'a Alem, Saudi Arabian novelist
 Kangni Alem, Togolese writer
 Mizan Alem, Ethiopian long-distance runner
 Shadia Alem, Saudi Arabian visual artist

Given name 
 Alem Marr, American politician
 Alem Mujaković, Slovenian footballer
 Telmo Além da Silva, Brazilian footballer
 Alem Zewde Tessema, Ethiopian military figure
 Alem Toskić, Serbian handball player
 Alem Merajić, Bosnian professional footballer
 Alem Koljić, Bosnian-Herzegovinian footballer

Other 

 Alem (beatboxer), French beatboxer
 Avigdor Glogauer (1725–1810), also known as Avigdor Levi and by the acronym Alem, was a German Jewish grammarian and poet.